The 2015–16 Auburn Tigers women's basketball team will represent Auburn University during the 2015–16 NCAA Division I women's basketball season. The Tigers, led by fourth year head coach Terri Williams-Flournoy, play their home games at Auburn Arena and were members of the Southeastern Conference. They finished the season 20–13, 8–8 in SEC play to finish in a 3-way tie for seventh place. They advanced to the quarterfinals of the SEC women's tournament where they lost to South Carolina. They received an at-large to the NCAA women's tournament where they defeated St. John's in the first before losing to Baylor in the second round.

Roster

Schedule

|-
!colspan=9 style="background:#172240; color:#FE3300;"| Non-conference regular season

|-
!colspan=9 style="background:#172240; color:#FE3300;"| SEC regular season

|-
!colspan=9 style="background:#172240; color:#FE3300;"| SEC Women's Tournament

|-
!colspan=9 style="background:#172240; color:#FE3300;"| NCAA Women's Tournament

Source

Rankings
2015–16 NCAA Division I women's basketball rankings

See also
 2015–16 Auburn Tigers men's basketball team

References

Auburn Tigers women's basketball seasons
Auburn
Auburn Tigers women's basketball
Auburn Tigers women's basketball
Auburn